Mikhail Prokofievich Kovalyov (– 31 August 1967) was a Soviet military officer.

Mikhail Kovalyov was born to family of a peasants in stanitsa Bryukhovetskaya, Kuban Oblast. In 1915 he enlisted in the Russian Army. After graduating from a School for Praporshchiks Kovalyov fought in World War I commanding a platoon (polurota), company and then a battalion. At the time of the October Revolution he was a Stabs-Captain. During the Russian Civil War he commanded a regiment and then a brigade in the Red Army participating in the fights against White Armies of Denikin, Wrangel and the peasant Tambov Rebellion of Alexander Antonov.

From 1937 Kovalyov was the commander of Kiev Military District, then from 1938, he was the commander of Belorussian Military District. He was the commander of the Belarusian Front during the Soviet invasion of Poland in September 1939. Kovalyov was also the commander of the 15th Army (Soviet Union) and led the Soviets to victory. As well as leading during the Winter War (1939–1940). He was the commander of Kharkov Military District, then Inspector of Infantry for the Red Army Commander of the Transbaikal Front during 1941.

In July 1945 he became a vice-commander of the Transbaikal Front and participated in military actions against Japan. From 1949 he was a vice-commander of Leningrad Military District. Kovalyov retired in 1955 and died in Leningrad in 1967 of lung cancer.

His awards include two Orders of Lenin, four Orders of the Red Banner, an Order of the Red Banner of Labour and an Order of Suvorov, 1st class.

References
Biography 

1897 births
1967 deaths
People from Bryukhovetsky District
People from Kuban Oblast
Central Committee of the Communist Party of the Soviet Union candidate members
First convocation members of the Soviet of the Union
Recipients of the Order of Lenin
Recipients of the Order of the Red Banner
Recipients of the Order of the Red Banner of Labour
Recipients of the Order of the Red Star
Recipients of the Order of Suvorov, 1st class
People of the Soviet invasion of Poland
Russian military personnel of World War I
Soviet colonel generals
Soviet leaders of Belarus
Soviet military personnel of the Russian Civil War
Soviet military personnel of the Winter War
Soviet military personnel of World War II
Burials at Bogoslovskoe Cemetery